The Aurora Awards are granted annually by the Canadian SF and Fantasy Association and SFSF Boreal Inc. The Award for Best Related Work (French: Autre oeuvre), was first recognized in 1983 as a separate category from Best Long-Form and was first granted in 1989 as the Award for Best Other Work (French: Réalisation autre) one granted to an English-language work and one to a French-language work. In 1999 it changed its name to Best Work (Other), and when the Prix Aurora and Prix Boreal combined, the awards adopted the name Best Related Work in 2012.

In 1983, two non-fiction works were recognized separately from other works, but neither were given an award. The French Award was not granted several times in 2003, 2005 and 2008 as there were insufficient entries.

On Spec has won the English award the most number of times at 7 awards, and Solaris has won the French award the most number of times at 21 awards.

English-language Award

Winners and nominees

  *   Winners and joint winners

French-language Award

Winners and nominees

  *   Winners and joint winners

References

Related